Stockjobbers were institutions that acted as market makers in the London Stock Exchange. The business of stockjobbing emerged in the 1690s during England's Financial Revolution. During the 18th century the jobbers attracted numerous critiques from Thomas Mortimer, Daniel Defoe and others. These writers denounced the use of market manipulation and front running and regarded it as unethical that the jobbers made money without any interest in the stocks involved. The business survived repeated legislation to ban it and became institutionalised.

Prior to the "Big Bang" deregulation of 1986, every stock traded on the Exchange passed through a 'jobber's book', that is, they acted as the ultimate purchasers of shares sold and the source of shares purchased, by stockbrokers on behalf of the latters' clients. Stockbrokers in turn were not permitted to be market makers.

In the final years of stockjobbing, the leading firms were Akroyd & Smithers, Wedd Durlacher, Pinchin Denny, Smith Brothers, Bisgood Bishop and Charles Pulley.  All of these firms were acquired by investment banks and other financial institutions.

References

Economy of the City of London
Stock market
History of the City of London